Centropyge tibicen, the keyhole angelfish, black angelfish, whitespot angelfish or puller angelfish, is a species of marine ray-finned fish, a marine angelfish belonging to the family Pomacanthidae. It is found in the Indo-Pacific region.

Description
Centropyge tibicen is mainly black in colour, the adults have an elongated vertical black blotch in the centre of the upper flanks. Smaller fish are mainly black with a white vertical bar which changes to a central blotch and becomes highly variable in form and extent. The dorsal and anal fins have a blue line just below their margin. Much of the pelvic and the front part of the anal fin are yellow. The caudal fin has a blue line which is positioned submarginally. The dorsal fin contains 14 spines and 15-16 soft rays while the anal fin has 3 spines and 16-17 soft rays.

Distribution
Centropyge tibicen Is found in the Indo-Pacific region. It occurs from northwestern coast of Australia and Christmas Island east through the Indo-Australian Archipelago to Vanuatu and Tonga in the east. They extend as far north as southern Japan and Taiwan and to Lord Howe Island.

Habitat and biology
It is an uncommon species of areas where there is a mixture of coral and rubble on both lagoon and seaward reefs. It is herbivorous and algae dominates its diet. It lives in harems of 3-7 fishes. This species is able to change sex from female to male, when there is no male in a harem, one of the females changes sex.

Systematics
Centropyge tibicen was first formally described as Holocanthus tibicen in 1831 by the French anatomist Georges Cuvier (1769-1832). The specific name tibicen means “trumpeter”, this is thought to be alluding to the name given to this species by the Dutch naturalist François Valentijn (1666-1727) in 1726, Japonfche Trompetter. When Johann Jakob Kaup described the genus Centropyge in 1860 he named Cuvier’s H. tibicen as the type species. As the type species it is placed in the subgenus Centropyge.

Utilisation
Centropyge tibicen is frequently found in the aquarium trade.

References

 http://www.marinespecies.org/aphia.php?p=taxdetails&id=278851
http://eol.org/pages/204723/details

External links
 

tibicen
Fish described in 1831
Taxa named by Georges Cuvier